Green vehicles may refer to:

 Green Vehicles, maker of the Triac (car) 
 Green vehicle - Environmentally friendly vehicles.